Gou Ji, is one of the most popular card games played in Qingdao, China.

Origin 
The game of Gou Ji was formed in Licang District, Qingdao during 1962 – 1963. It was created by people who played Winner, and the player number was enlarged then. Rules of the game is mainly formed when the rules of Union and Head Rival was created.

Objective 
Gou Ji is played among six people with four pack of Poker cards. The objective of the game is to be the player to have no cards left earlier, and make union which the player belong to get more scores.

Rules of the Game够级

Positioning 
In this picture, player 1, 3, 5 are in one Union, and the same for 2, 4 and 6. Player 1 and 4 are Head to head rivals, and the same for player 2, 5 and player 3, 6.

Cards 
Individual cards are ranked. Colored Joker > Black & White Joker > 2 > Ace (A) > King (K) > Queen (Q) > Jack (J) > 10 > 9 > 8 > 7 > 6 > 5 > 4 > 3.

Suits are irrelevant. Players can play the game with all the suits erased from the cards.

Money 
Card "2" is called "money" when handing with other cards (except both Jokers). The 2 becomes the same ranking with the card(s) which is(are) handed. For example, 2-2-4-4-4 is equivalence to 4-4-4-4-4. But using 2 in Gou Ji cards make the Gou Ji cards "not pure".

Joker 
Both Jokers can be used the same as money, but more useful than it. If a number of black jokers is handed with other cards, only the same or bigger number of colored jokers can be handed out after it, and the total number of cards should be the same of previous handing.

If a number of colored jokers is handed with other cards, handing after it is impossible in some rules. In other rules, two colored jokers can be a joker that is bigger than colored joker, and it can defeat such handing.

Handing the Cards

Normal Handings 
Primarily, the player can hand any number of cards with the same ranking, for example, 7, 3-3-3, 4-4-4-4, K-K-K-K-K-K.

Every player will then have a chance to hand, for example, if player 1 hands his or her card as in the picture above, player 2-3-4-5-6 will then have a chance to hand. The handing must have the pokers which have same amount of number of the first handing, the ranking of pokers must be the same (unless money or joker is involved, and the same below) and the ranking must bigger than the ranking that is previously handed. Such process is called follow.

If nobody follows, the player who hand last will repeat the process mentioned in the previous paragraph.

A round starts when a player hand his/her own card after the previous nobody-follow situation and ends when nobody wants to follow after a player hands his/her card.

When a player refuse to hand in his/her card for the previous handing, he/she can pass, and the next player will have a chance to follow.

Players are unable to follow in the current round if he passed once, except for head rivals. A player can still follow his/her own head rival's hand when nobody wants to follow even if he passed once in the current round.

Gou Ji-ing 
If Gou Ji cards are handed, the handing order will be ignored. The next handing chance will be and only will be given to the player's head rival (expect for a player who didn't pass beginning to burning cards). Handing Gou Ji cards and leading to this process is called Gou Ji.

Gou Ji cards include the same or greater amount of:

5*"10"

4*"J"

3*"Q"

2*"K"

2*"A"

1*"2"

1*"Joker"

Any handing with joker(s).

It can be concluded that following Gou Ji cards’ solution can only be handing bigger Gou Ji cards.

If a player's head rival refuse or unable to hand after Gou Ji, the player who hands this set of cards get a "point" from his head rival. Specially, for 10-J-Q-K-A situation, the point is only get when the last set of the Gou Ji cards is pure, which means that no 2 or Jokers were involved.

When one player have handed out all of their cards, his head rival is called "Headless". The headless player can hand after Gou Ji cards handed by any player, and vice versa.

When two or more players have handed out all of their cards, Gou Ji cards lost speciality then become normal cards, resulting that the rest players are unable to burning cards, and who haven't get point are unable to get point in this game.

Burning Cards 
After Gou Ji, if a player

a)    is not the head rival of the player who started Gou Ji

b)    didn't pass in current round

c)    is able to follow this set of Gou Ji cards

d)    follows before the head rival of the player who started Gou Ji

e)    in some rules, have got a point from head rival

he/she started the process of burning cards, and this process includes the hand handed in d). And after that, if:

a)    the player successfully handed out all his/her cards legally, which means except for the first and last handing(does not include in some rules), every handing includes a Joker, and this player have no cards after the last handing, the player then successfully burned his/her card. The player who has been interrupted will give the player who burns his/her card one card in the start of next match, called "burning tribute".

b)    The player(A) started burning cards, while any other player(B) also started burning cards during A's burning process, and successfully burned all his cards before A do, this process is called "counter-burning", A will give B 2 burning tributes in the start of next match.

c)    The player started burning cards, but the head rival of the player who started burning cards hands cards which stopped this player from burning cards, the game continues without any other penalties.

d)    The player started burning cards but have one or more illegal handing according to a), he will be the 6th place during this match, and this match continues.

Scoring 
The player who successfully handed out all his/her cards first is on 1st place, and the same can be inferred in the same manner.

1st place +2 points for his/her union.

2nd +1;

5th -1;

6th -2.

Declaring Point 
If, a player declares a point, which means, the player declares that his/her head-to -head rival will never have point in this match after receiving all his card.

If this point is clear, player will get a tribute of 2 cards from his head rival if the other player didn't get point, and he will pay his head rival a tribute of 4 cards if his head-to head rival got a point.

If this point is unclear, player will get a tribute of 4 cards from his head rival if the other player didn't get point, and he will pay his head rival a tribute of 8 cards if his head-to head rival got a point.

Unclear point is declared before dealing cards, and a clear point is declared after it.

Other procedures

Declaring unclear point

Dealing cards 
The card is dealt counterclockwise.

Declaring clear point

Starting work 
A procedure that determines which player hand cards firstly in the first match. Every player show the biggest number of cards with the same suit they have. This card's ranking should be the lowest without card's that have special rules. Then, the first player is:

a)    The player who have most such cards.

b)    If two player have the same answer in a), the player who showed earlier

c)    Chosen randomly

Afterwards, every match's first handing player is the 6th player of previous match.

Paying Tribute 
Every starting of a match (expect the first one), some players should pay tribute to other players. The tribute is the biggest card that you have. Player who receive the tribute can refuse. Tributes are listed in order below:

a)    Pointing tribute. 
This tribute involves all 3 pairs of head rivals

If A and B are head rivals, 3 situations are:

i. Both A and B got a point from each other. No Pointing tribute.

ii. One player got a point while the other not. The player who don't have a point will pay the player who have a point one a tribute of one card.

iii. Both A and B didn't open points. Both player will pay the other player a tribute of one card.

The chart indicades all situations.

b)    Burning tribute. 
See Burning Cards chapter to know when to pay this type of tribute. This tribute includes 1 card.

c)    Tributes that is mentioned in special rules

d)    Ranking Tribute 
5th player will give 2nd player a tribute of 1 card .

6th player will give 1st player a tribute of 2 cards.

Special Regulations for Paying Tribute 
a)    after paying tribute, the receiver will return the same amount of card in any rank, including the tribute itself.

b)    Tribute should be shown to all players.

c)    If 3 players in one union are 1st,2nd,3rd players, no tributes mentioned above will be paid. Everyone in enemy union only have to pay his/her head rival a tribute of one card. This is called Stringing three players.

Revolution 
If, after getting his/her cards, a player has no Joker, 2, this player can declare revolution. A revolution player will automatically get 3rd place. Special Regulations for Paying Tribute's c) still applicable. His/her head rival will automatically get a point. If 2 (including) players or above declares revolution, the card will be reshuffled and the match is started again.

Special Rules and Variants

Two colored Jokers 
In some rules, two colored joker can become one card that is bigger than colored joker when handed together.

Holding 3 

In some rules, 3 must be held, and be handed out (joker and 2 cannot be handed together) in one player's last handing. If a player failed to get a 3 after dealing cards, he has to buy several "3" by same number of "2" from any player who able to sell him "3", except having no "2" then get a "3" for free.

Suffocation 
If a player failed to hand 3 because a player handed cards against his penultimate handing, he is called "Suffocated" then become 6th, and he should give this player a "Suffocate Tribute" of one card. If multiple suffocation happen in one game, the 2nd player being suffocated become 5th, and the like.

Holding 4 before getting point 
In some rules, 4 must not be handed until the player gets point. If a player handed 4 without having a handing of pure Gou Ji cards not followed by head rival, or in some variants handed 4 partially or together with 2 or jokers, he is failed to get point in this game. If a player failed to get a 4 after dealing cards, he has to buy several "4" by same number of "2" from any player who able to sell him "4", except having no "2" then get a "4" for free.

Difference of paying tribute 
The amount of card to be paid may vary.

Six 3 and Six or Eight 4 
In some variants the number of cards 3 and/or 4 are reduced to only 6 in order to make 3 and 4 buying occur in most games. Sometimes number of card 4 is 8, keeping numbers of cards of each player same at 33.

More card decks 
In some variants number of card decks is added, often to 6.

References

Chinese card games